Saban  is a village in the sub-governorate of Bariq in  the province of Asir, Saudi Arabia.

Location and population
It is located at an elevation of 470 meters and has a population of 2,000.

Connections
It is connected with the main road by a 4 Kilometer.

See also 

 List of cities and towns in Saudi Arabia
 Regions of Saudi Arabia

References 

Populated places in 'Asir Province
Populated coastal places in Saudi Arabia
Populated places in Bareq